64 Zoo Lane (French: 64, rue du Zoo) is an animated series created by Belgian-born English author An Vrombaut. The series is co-produced by French animation studio Millimages and British-based Zoo Lane Productions in association with ZDF and ZDF Enterprises (Series 1-2). La Cinquième, The Itsy Bitsy Entertainment Co. (Series 2), Sofica Cofanim and CBeebies (Series 3-4), with the participation of France 5 (Series 3)/France Televisions (Series 4).

The first two seasons aired from 1999 to 2003. After a seven-year hiatus, the series returned in 2010 for another two seasons, ending in 2013. A total of 104 episodes were produced.

Synopsis
The series follows a 7-year-old girl named Lucy who lives next door to a zoo at 64 Zoo Lane. Each night, she is told a story by the animals. Characters include Georgina the Giraffe, Nelson the Elephant, Tickles and Giggles the Monkeys, Boris the Bear, and Molly the Hippopotamus. The programme emphasizes friendship and responsibility. At the story's end, friendly morals are discussed, then bedtime is declared. Georgina deposits Lucy into bed via the bedroom window (later episodes show Lucy yawning and then sleeping soundly in bed; in the original episodes she would be lulled to sleep by the storytelling itself).
Opportunities for learning: exploring language and vocabulary are enhanced by the use of intonation and expression in the character's voices and the themes of the animals' stories support social and emotional issues, including friendships and helping and caring for others. The creator of the TV series, An Vrombaut, also wrote and illustrated six 64 Zoo Lane picture books based on stories from the TV series.

Episodes

Characters

Main Characters
 Lucy (Voiced by Ciara Janson (American with an American accent in the US)) – A 7-year-old human girl. She speaks American with an American accent in the US version by Lobster Films.
 Georgina the Giraffe (Voiced by Dian Perry in the US) – A giraffe with the blue colored spots. She also speaks American with an American accent in the American English version by Lobster Films.
 Nelson the Elephant (Voiced by Keith Wickham) – A green-colored elephant, who has a nephew named Nigel.
 Molly the Hippopotamus (Voiced by Anna Bentinck) – A blue-colored hippopotamus.
 Giggles and Tickles the Monkeys (Voiced by Dian Perry and Megg Nicol in the US) – 2 playful prankster monkeys though their practical jokes can sometimes cause trouble.
 Boris the Bear (Voiced by Lewis MacLeod) - He speaks Russian with a Russian accent.

The African Characters
 Nathalie the Antelope (Voiced by Megg Nicol in the US) – An antelope who loves to dance and jump around. She also speaks American with an American accent in the American version by Lobster Films.
 Audrey the Ostrich (Voiced by Megg Nicol in the US) – An ostrich who is very wise and often gives advises to the other animals. She also speaks American with an American accent in the American version by Lobster Films.
 Reginald the Lion (Voiced by Keith Wickham) – A lion whose naps would often get disturbed. While not napping, he is often seen licking a bone. He speaks Deep African with an Deep African accent.
 The Snip Snip Bird (Voiced by Bob Saker) – A green-colored bird, who lives at the top of the mountain.
 King Snake (Voiced by Keith Wickham)
 Victor the Crocodile (Voiced by Keith Wickham) – An grumpy crocodile who acts cruel but deep down he cares about the others.
 Kevin the Crocodile (Voiced by Dan Russell (Southern with a Southern accent in the US)) – A young crocodile who is the animal friends with Toby and Doris. He has a completely actual male voice and speaks Southern with a Southern accent in the US version by Lobster Films.
 Doris the Duck (Voiced by Adrienne Posta) – A young duck who is the animal friend with Kevin and Toby. She is very helpful but she can also be a little bossy.
 Toby the Tortoise (Voiced by Bob Saker) – A blue-colored tortoise who is a little self-conscious because of being slow. He speaks East Country with an East Country accent.
 Isabel the Flamingo (Voiced by Adrienne Posta) - She speaks Italian with an Italian accent.
 Maribelle the Flamingo (Voiced by Anna Bentinck) - She also speaks Italian with an Italian accent.
 Annabelle the Flamingo (Voiced by Adrienne Posta) - She also speaks Italian with an Italian accent too.
 Herbert the Warthog (Voiced by Keith Wickham) – A warthog who has a fond of watermelons. He is a great musician and loves bathing in mud.
 Zed the Zebra (Voiced by Lewis MacLeod) – A zebra who runs very fast.
 Alan the Aardvark (Voiced by Keith Wickham) – An aardvark who is usually seen eating ants.
 Ronald the Rhinoceros (Voiced by Keith Wickham) – A rhinoceros who likes bashing boulders into pieces. He also speaks Yorkshire with an Yorkshire accent.
 The Tic Tic Bird (Voiced by Lewis MacLeod (speaking) and Dan Russell (singing)) – A colorful bird who is Ronald's best friend. He also speaks Yorkshire with an Yorkshire accent.
 William the Weaver Bird (Voiced by Lewis MacLeod (speaking) and Dan Russell (humming and scatting)) – A weaver bird who is often seen building a nest. He also speaks Scottish with a Scottish accent.
 Pauline the Pelican (Voiced by Adrienne Posta) – A pelican who is fond of fish. She is a little clumsy but also very nice and friendly. She also speaks Yorkshire with an Yorkshire accent.
 Nigel the Elephant Calf (Voiced by Matt Wilkinson)
 Harry the Hyena (Voiced by Lewis MacLeod)
 Edna the Hyena (Voiced by Adrienne Posta)
 Holly and Johnnie the Hyena Pups (Voiced by Anna Bentinck and Keith Wickham)
 Seamus the Stork (Voiced by Keith Wickham) – A stork who flies very fast. He speaks Irish with an Irish accent.
 Eddie the Little Hippopotamus Calf (Voiced by Lewis MacLeod) – A young and mischievous hippopotamus calf.
 Henrietta the Hairy Hippopotamus (Voiced by Anna Bentinck) – A hairy hippotamus who is one of Molly's relatives.
 "Cleopatra" Patsy the Porcupine (Voiced by Anna Bentinck) - She also speaks Yorkshire with an Yorkshire accent.
 Casper the Chameleon (Voiced by Lewis MacLeod) – A cheeky chameleon who likes to camouflage. Ignoring Granddad Chameleon's warning, he gets into trouble.
 Granddad Chameleon (Voiced by Keith Wickham)
 Dennis the Dromedary (Voiced by Keith Wickham) – A curious dromedary. He also speaks Yorkshire with an Yorkshire accent.
 Gary the Little Dromedary Calf (Voiced by Lewis MacLeod) – An uncle of Dennis.
 Doctor Gordon Gorilla (Voiced by Bob Saker) - a gorilla is Africa's physician and the uncle of Giggles and Tickles.
 Esmeralda the Snake (Voiced by Adrienne Posta) – A snake who collects the shells and likes having everything clean.
 Cousin Chuckles the Monkey (Voiced by Lewis MacLeod) - He also speaks Irish with an Irish accent too.
 Lily the Ostrich (voiced by Adrienne Posta) – A young ostrich, daughter of Audrey.
 Doogal the Ostrich (voiced by Anna Bentinck) – A young ostrich, son of Audrey.
 Rosie the Rhinoceros (Voiced by Anna Bentinck) - She also speaks Yorkshire with an Yorkshire accent too.
 Petula the Parrot (Voiced by Adrienne Posta)

The North American Characters
 Melanie the Moose (Voiced by Adrienne Posta) – A female moose with the antlers. She is clumsy, but kind. She speaks Brummie with an Brummie accent.
 Beverly the Beaver (Voiced by Anna Bentinck) – A beaver that is often trying to perfect her dam. She also speaks American with an American accent too.
 Randolph the Raccoon (Voiced by Dan Russell) – A raccoon who grows a yield of mushrooms. He speaks with a Southern Drawl accent.
 Barbara the Bison (voiced by Anna Bentinck) – A baby bison is a found her family.
 Chipmunks Alfie and Charlie (voiced by Bob Saker and Matt Wilkinson)
 Mr. and Mrs. Bison (voiced by Anna Bentinck and Dan Russell) – The parents of Barbara.

The South American Characters
 Adam the Armadillo (Voiced by Keith Wickham) – An armadillo who likes to roll.
 Jazz the Jaguar (Voiced by Dan Russell) - He speaks Hispanic with an Hispanic accent.
 Leopoldo the Llama (Voiced by Lewis MacLeod) - He speaks Cockney with an Cockney accent.
 Taco the Toucan (Voiced by Bob Saker) - He also speaks Hispanic with an Hispanic accent too.
 Annie the Anaconda (Voiced by Anna Bentinck)
 Dudley the Sloth (Voiced by Bob Saker) - He also speaks East Country with an East Country accent too.
 Itchy Quatzel the Mysterious Mountain (Voiced by Bob Saker)
 Tallulah the Toucan (voiced by unknown)

The Australian Characters
 Joey the Little Kangaroo (Voiced by Keith Wickham) – A young kangaroo who had trouble in learning to jump but finally learnt to do so. He speaks Australian with an Australian accent.
 Jimmy the Little Kangaroo (Voiced by Lewis MacLeod) – A young kangaroo who used to bully Joey, but later they became friends. He also speaks Australian with an Australian accent.
 Janet and Elvis the Kangaroo Parents (Voiced by Adrienne Posta and Bob Saker) - They also speak Australian with an Australian accents.
 Janice the Kangaroo (Voiced by Adrienne Posta) - She also speaks Australian with an Australian accent.
 Wally the Wombat (Voiced by Keith Wickham) - He speaks English with an English accent.
 Mr. Platypus (Voiced by Lewis MacLeod) - He also speaks Australian with an Australian accent.
 Julie the Mother Kangaroo (Voiced by Anna Bentinck) - She also speaks Australian with an Australian accent.
 Ribbit the Frog (Voiced by Lewis MacLeod) - He speaks Scottish with a Scottish accent.
 Phoebe the Koala (Voiced by Anna Bentinck) – A young koala who is the Australian animal friends with Jimmy and Joey. She is very shy and self-conscious. She also speaks Australian with an Australian accent too.
 Carrie the Cockatoo (voiced by Adrienne Posta)

The North Pole Characters
 Snowbert the Polar Bear (Voiced by Dan Russell) – A polar bear who is Boris's northern cousin. He used to live alone until he met Sidney the Seal. He likes making ice sculptures. He speaks American with an American accent.
 Sidney the Seal (Voiced by Keith Wickham) – A seal that befriended Snowbert.

Mossy Bay Island Characters
 Jamie the Littlest Puffin (Voiced by Anna Bentinck) - He also speaks Irish with an Irish accent.
 Thomas, Sharon and Lewis the Puffins (Voiced by Keith Wickham, Adrienne Posta and Lewis MacLeod) - They also speak Irish with an Irish accents.
 Hercule Mustache the Walrus (Voiced by Bob Saker) - He speaks French with a French accent.
 Thelma the Whale (voiced by Anna Bentinck)
 Gunnar the Seagull (voiced by Dan Russell)
 Jack Big Claw the Crab (voiced by unknown)

Asiatic characters
 Bao Bao the Giant Panda (voiced by unknown)
 Gertie the Goat (voiced by unknown)
 Cassandra the Crane (voiced by Anna Bentinck)
 Horace the Hare (voiced by Keith Wickham)
 Confuse-us the Carp (voiced by unknown)

Development
The series was originally aimed for a broadcast on Canal J, with Itel handling international distribution, and Buena Vista Home Entertainment holding video rights in all territories except the U.S. and Japan. Itsy Bitsy Entertainment acquired US rights to the series for an airing on Fox Family Channel.

The series was redubbed with American voice actors for the US airings, with actors including Ciara Janson, Dian Perry and Megg Nicol. Kevin the Crocodile is voiced by Dan Russell in order to make him sound like an actual male voice and speaks with a Southern accent in the US version.

Broadcast
In the United Kingdom, the series aired on the CBBC block on BBC One and BBC Two, before transitioning to CBeebies, with pay TV rights being held by Playhouse Disney. In February 2023, the series was re-broadcast on Sky Kids as one of the channel's launch programmes.

Home media

France
DVDs of the series have been released by companies like France Télévisions Distribution (through Warner Home Video) and Millimages themselves (through Paramount Home Entertainment).

United Kingdom
A VHS release from Buena Vista Home Entertainment was planned for release in 2001, but was cancelled for unknown reasons.

In 2004, Maverick Entertainment signed a UK home video agreement with Millimages, and released three VHS/DVDs of the series.

On August 26, 2013, Abbey Home Media released a DVD called "The Story of the Jungle Ball", containing nine episodes from the fourth season.

United States
From 2008-2009, PorchLight Home Entertainment released three DVDs of the series, each containing 8 episodes.

References

External links
 
 Author's website
 Information on Millimages
 
 HuffPost TV Episode Guide
 BBC Programme Information

1990s British children's television series
2000s British children's television series
2010s British children's television series
1990s British animated television series
2000s British animated television series
2010s British animated television series
1999 British television series debuts
2013 British television series endings
1990s French animated television series
2000s French animated television series
2010s French animated television series
1999 French television series debuts
2013 French television series endings
1990s preschool education television series
2000s preschool education television series
2010s preschool education television series
Animated preschool education television series
British children's animated fantasy television series
British children's animated supernatural television series
British flash animated television series
French children's animated fantasy television series
French children's animated supernatural television series
French flash animated television series
English-language television shows
BBC children's television shows
BBC Scotland television shows
CBeebies
France Télévisions children's television series
Animated television series about children
Animated television series about mammals
British preschool education television series
French preschool education television series